Sadhukkadi (Devanagari: सधुक्कड़ी) was a vernacular dialect of the Hindi Belt of medieval North India, and a mix of Hindi languages (Hindustani, Haryanvi, Braj Bhasha, Awadhi, Bhojpuri, Marwari) and Punjabi, hence it is also commonly called a Panchmail Khichari. Since it is simpler, it is used in adult literacy books or early literacy books. 

It is common variant of Hindi and finds place in the oral tradition and the writings of medieval poets and saints in Hindi Literature like Kabir and Guru Nanak. Other poets like Mirabai, Baba Farid, and Shah Latif used it in addition to local variations of Rajasthani, Punjabi and Sindhi languages.

The term "Sadhukkadi" was coined by Ramchandra Shukla (1884-1941), and not all scholars agree with the use of this term, or the identity of the languages which it covers.

See also
 Sant Bhasha

References

Hindi languages
Languages of Uttar Pradesh